Wuxue, formerly Guangji County (Postal Romanization: Kwangtsi), is a county-level city on the north shore of the Yangtze River in eastern Hubei province, People's Republic of China. Wuxue falls under the administration of the prefecture-level city of Huanggang.

Geography

The city has Mount Lu to the east, is close to the Qizhou hometown of famed ancient pharmacist Li Shizhen in neighboring Qichun County in the west, borders the Yangtze River in the south, and leans against the Dabie Shan mountain range in the north.

Wuxue is 220 kilometers downriver from the provincial capital of Wuhan and about 50 kilometers upriver from the port of Jiujiang City, on the south side of the Yangtze in Jiangxi province.

Climate

Administrative divisions 
Wuxue administers four subdistricts and eight towns:

History
Wuxue opened as a port towards the end of the 16th century. Upon China signing the 1876 Yantai treaty with Britain, foreign merchants established an upgraded wharf.

The port's strategic advantage lies in its proximity to the juncture of three provinces — Hubei, Anhui, and Jiangxi — and serves as a central hub for commodity trade.

The port was modernized in 1953, with further-enhanced navigational improvements in 1975 and 1980. The total length of the port waterfront is now 14 kilometers, with 23 quay berths and many large warehouses, hoists, and cranes. The port handles both commodity and passenger traffic.

Transportation
In addition to the port, Wuxue is known as the "Gateway to Three Provinces" (mentioned above). As well, it is served by the east-west inter-provincial Shanghai-Hibiscus Expressway, and is a major station on the Beijing-Guangzhou railway. A passenger ferry runs across the river and downstream to Jiujiang, and Wuxue is about one hour by car from Jiujiang airport.

References

Cities in Hubei
Populated places on the Yangtze River
County-level divisions of Hubei
Huanggang